Gospel According to PJ: From the Songbook of PJ Morton is the eighth self-released studio album by American singer-songwriter PJ Morton. It's Morton's first-ever gospel album. It was released on August 28, 2020, by Morton Records and Empire Records. Gospel According to PJ incorporates gospel styles with elements of soul music. The album is entirely produced by Morton himself and features guest appearances by Bishop Paul S. Morton, Kim Burrell, J Moss, Kirk Franklin, Jermaine Dolly, Lena Byrd Miles, Commissioned, Darrel 'MusiqCity' Walls, Zacardi Cortez, Le'Andria Johnson, Mary Mary, The Clark Sisters, Smokie Norful, Tasha Cobbs Leonard, Brian Courtney Wilson, Travis Greene and Yolanda Adams.

Background
The album was first announced on August 13, 2020.
Due to the COVID-19 pandemic, Gospel According to PJ was led by video-conferenced collaborations from Morton's New Orleans studio. In between the songs are three interludes capturing a conversation between PJ and his dad, discussing the journey to a moment they never thought would come. "That's my favorite part of the album," PJ confesses. "It's a story about a father and son, and my father supporting me and being there for me even though I didn't necessarily take the path that people thought I should. We still got to this album, me being who I am, and me making him proud. He supported me through all of it."

Track listing

References

2020 albums
Grammy Award for Best Gospel Album
PJ Morton albums
Albums impacted by the COVID-19 pandemic